Flash Flash Flash is the first album from The Explosion. It was released in 2000 on Jade Tree Records.

Track listing
"No Revolution" – 2:21
"God Bless The S.O.S." – 1:36
"Reactor" – 2:25
"Broken Down And Out" – 2:10
"Outbound Line" – 2:13
"Tarantulas Attack" – 1:27
"Terrorist" – 2:46
"The Ideal" – 1:41
"If You Don't Know" – 2:09
"Novocaine" – 1:20
"Leave It In The Dirt" – 1:47
"Conniption Fit" – 1:59
"Points West" – 1:34
"True Or False" – 1:54

References

2000 debut albums
The Explosion albums
Jade Tree (record label) albums